Gan Gan  is a village and municipality in Chubut Province in southern Argentina.

Geography

Climate 
This town is located in the middle of northern Patagonia, right in the steppe. Consequently, the climate is cold semi-arid (BSk, according to the Köppen climate classification) and it can be quite extreme: temperatures can range from well above 35 °C (95 °F) on the hottest summer days (but with cold, desert nights at around 10 °C or 50 °F) to lows that might reach −35 °C (−31 °F).
Usually, summer days average 24 °C (75 °F) and nights 10 °C (50 °F), whereas winter days average 4 °C (40 °F) and nights, −3 °C (27 °F). Snow is relatively common and the weather is generally windy.

References

Populated places in Chubut Province